Return of the Jedi: Death Star Battle is a shoot 'em up video game published by Parker Brothers in 1983 for the Atari 2600, Atari 5200, and Atari 8-bit family. In 1985, it was published by Sinclair Research as part of a software pack bundled with ZX Spectrum+.   It was one of the earliest Star Wars-related video games, following Star Wars: The Empire Strikes Back in 1982 and alongside  Atari's 1983 Star Wars arcade game. It was the first video game based on Return of the Jedi.

Gameplay

In the game, the player controls the Millennium Falcon with the aim of destroying the second Death Star. The game is split into two stages. In the first, the player must shoot enemy TIE fighters while waiting for an opportunity to pass through an energy shield.

In the second stage, the player must shoot at parts of the Death Star until there is a clear path to the reactor. Once the reactor has been destroyed, the player must survive the resultant explosion.

Once these objectives are completed, the game begins again in a new round with greater difficulty.

Packaging
The cover art depicts the Millennium Falcon in flight away from the partially constructed Death Star, pursued by four TIE interceptors. It was produced by John Berkey, the noted science fiction artist who designed some of the earliest poster art for the original 1977 film, Star Wars.

See also
Return of the Jedi, a 1984 arcade game from Atari

References

External links
Return of the Jedi: Death Star Battle at Atari Mania (Atari 2600 version)
Return of the Jedi: Death Star Battle at Atari Mania (Atari 8-bit family version)

1983 video games
Atari 2600 games
Atari 5200 games
Atari 8-bit family games
Cancelled Intellivision games
Parker Brothers video games
Return of the Jedi video games
Video games developed in the United States
ZX Spectrum games